Ye'af is a community settlement in central Israel. Located in the Sharon plain near Tel Mond, it falls under the jurisdiction of Lev HaSharon Regional Council.

History
The village was founded in 1990 as an expansion for the moshavim surrounding it: Kfar Yabetz, Azri'el and Porat. Later it became an independent rural settlement.

References

Community settlements
Populated places established in 1990
Populated places in Central District (Israel)
1990 establishments in Israel